The Wrigley Trophy is an award given for motorboats. It was awarded as early as 1912 with a $1,500 cash prize. In 1912 the award was disputed when James A. Pugh contested the win by J. Stuart Blackton. He argued that Baby Reliance II was allowed a late entry and had already missed two rounds of competition.

Winners
Cassandra (raceboat); George Griffith (1960) 
Baby Reliance II, J. Stuart Blackton (1912)

References

Science and technology awards
Motorboat racing